Charvin Dixon (born September 19, 1954) is an American sports shooter. He competed in the mixed trap event at the 1976 Summer Olympics.

References

External links
 

1954 births
Living people
American male sport shooters
Olympic shooters of the United States
Shooters at the 1976 Summer Olympics
People from Nogales, Arizona
Pan American Games medalists in shooting
Pan American Games gold medalists for the United States
Pan American Games silver medalists for the United States
Shooters at the 1975 Pan American Games
Shooters at the 1979 Pan American Games
20th-century American people
21st-century American people